Anopheles (Anopheles) reidi is a species complex of barbirostris mosquito belonging to the genus Anopheles. It is endemic to Sri Lanka.

References

External links
A GUIDE TO THE IDENTIFICATION OF THE ANOPHELINE o MOSQUITOES (DIPTERA: CULICIDAE) OF SRI LANKA. H. LARVAE 
Anopheles (An.) Reidi, A New Species of the Barbirostris Species Complex from Sri Lanka (Diptera:Culicidae)

reidi
Insects described in 1973